The National Moment of Remembrance is an annual event that asks Americans, wherever they are at 3:00 p.m. local time on Memorial Day, to pause for a duration of one minute to remember those who have died in military service to the United States. The time 3 p.m. was chosen because it is the time when most Americans are enjoying time off of work for the national holiday. The Moment was first proclaimed in May 2000 for Memorial Day that year, and was put in law by the United States Congress in December 2000.

Background

The idea for the Moment was born in May 1996 when children touring Lafayette Park in Washington, DC, the nation’s capital, were asked by the Commission’s Director what Memorial Day means. They responded, “That’s the day the pools open.” A May 2000 Gallup poll revealed that only 28% of Americans knew the true meaning of Memorial Day. The White House Commission on Remembrance was established by Congress (via PL 106-579) to promote the values of Memorial Day by acts of remembrance throughout the year.

The Moment does not replace traditional Memorial Day events, but is a specific time designated to remember the legacy of the holiday. As detailed by the official act, "Congress called on the people of the United States, in a symbolic act of unity, to observe a National Moment of Remembrance to honor the men and women of the United States who died in the pursuit of freedom and peace."

Participants 
As laid out in Public Law 106-579, the National Moment of Remembrance is to be practiced by all Americans throughout the nation at 3:00 p.m. local time. At the same time, a number of organizations throughout the country also observe the Moment: all Major League Baseball games halt, Amtrak train whistles sound across the country, and hundreds of other nationwide participants remind Americans to pause for the Memorial Day National Moment of Remembrance.

Other participants include:
 TAPS ACROSS AMERICA WWW.TapsAcrossAmerica.org 
 Ranch Outlet
 NASCAR
 Greyhound
 Empire State Building
 National Grocers Association
 Statue of Liberty
 Port Authority of New York and New Jersey
 National Constitution Center
 NASA
 United Spinal Association
 Delaware Park
 Liberty Bell
 National Association for Music Education
 Bugles Across America
 Getzen Instrument Company
 Veseli Baseball
 Staten Island University Hospital

References

Public holidays in the United States